The Ministry of Defence of the Czech Republic (MO ČR) is the primary agency of the Czech Republic responsible for the planning and carrying-out of defense policy. It is the Czech Republic's ministry of defence. It is the direct successor of the Czechoslovak Ministry of Defence. Its current headquarters is located in Prague. The current Minister of Defence is Jana Černochová, in office since 17 December 2021.

List of Ministers
Antonín Baudyš (2 July 1992 – 21 September 1994)
Vilém Holáň (22 September 1994 – 4 July 1996)
Miloslav Výborný (4 July 1996 – 2 January 1998)
Michal Lobkowicz (2 January 1998 – 22 July 1998)
Vladimír Vetchý (22 July 1998 – 4 May 2001)
Jaroslav Tvrdík (4 May 2001 – 9 June 2003)
Miroslav Kostelka (9 July 2003 – 4 August 2004)
Karel Kühnl (4 August 2004 – 4 September 2006)
Jiří Šedivý (4 September 2006 – 9 January 2007)
Vlasta Parkanová (9 January 2007 – 8 May 2009)
Martin Barták (8 May 2009 – 13 July 2010)
Alexandr Vondra (13 July 2010 – 7 December 2012)
Karolína Peake (12 – 20 December 2012)
Petr Nečas (21 December 2012 – 18 March 2013)
Vlastimil Picek (19 March 2013 – 29 January 2014)
Martin Stropnický (29 January 2014 – 13 December 2017)
Karla Šlechtová (13 December 2017 – 27 June 2018)
Lubomír Metnar (27 June 2018 – 17 December 2021)
Jana Černochová (17 December 2021 – incumbent)

References

External links

Official website

Defence
Czech Republic
Czechia
Czechia